Switzerland participated at the 2015 Summer Universiade in Gwangju, South Korea.

Medal summary

Medal by sports

Medalists

References
 Country overview: Switzerland on the official website

Nations at the 2015 Summer Universiade
Switzerland at the Summer Universiade
2015 in Swiss sport